The 1927 Santa Barbara State Roadrunners football team represented Santa Barbara State during the 1927 college football season.

Santa Barbara State competed in the California Coast Conference (CCC) in 1927. The Roadrunners were led by second-year head coach Dudley DeGroot and played home games at Peabody Stadium in Santa Barbara, California. They finished the season with a record of three wins and five losses (3–5, 1–2 CCC). Overall, the team was outscored by its opponents 52–167 for the season and was shut out in four of the eight games.

Schedule

Notes

References

Santa Barbara State
UC Santa Barbara Gauchos football seasons
Santa Barbara State Roadrunners football